Moli may refer to:

People
 Atu Moli (born 1995), New Zealand rugby player
 Fabio Moli (born 1969), Argentinian boxer
 Jacob Moli (born 1967), Solomon Islands football player
 Josias Moli (born 1954), Vanuatuan politician
 Liaki Moli (born 1990), New Zealand-born Japanese rugby player
 Malietoa Moli, Samoan king
 Moli Duru Ambae, Australian politician
 Moli Lesesa (born 1984), Lesotho football player
 Sam Moli, New Zealand rugby player

Places
 Moli, Nepal

Other
 E-One Moli Energy
 Moli language (disambiguation)
 Museum of Literature Ireland

See also
 Moly (disambiguation)
 Molly (disambiguation)